My Cat Likes to Hide in Boxes is a very popular New Zealand children’s book, which has also attained popularity in the United Kingdom and Canada. It was written by Eve Sutton and Lynley Dodd, cousins-in-law. The book was first published in 1974 and won the 1975 Esther Glen Award.

According to Dodd, the book is based upon the "Dodd family cat, Wooskit, who, like all cats, liked to hide in boxes, supermarket bags, cupboards and hidey-holes of all kinds." The book itself consists of descriptions of other cats from other countries, all followed by the phrase “but my cat likes to hide in boxes.”

After the book's publication, Eve Sutton went on to write books for older children. Lynley Dodd, however, continued to write for younger children—which eventually led to her famous Hairy Maclary series of children’s books.

References

1974 children's books
Picture books
Books by Lynley Dodd
Fictional cats
New Zealand children's books
Books about cats